Gogui is a small town and rural commune in the Cercle of Nioro in the Kayes Region of western Mali. The town is on the frontier with Mauritania.

References

External links
.

Communes of Kayes Region